The languages of Spain, or Spanish languages, are the languages spoken in Spain.
 
Most languages spoken in Spain belong to the Romance language family, of which Spanish is the only language which has official status for the whole country. Various other languages have co-official or recognised status in specific territories, and a number of unofficial languages and dialects are spoken in certain localities.

Present-day languages

In terms of the number of speakers and dominance, the most prominent of the languages of Spain is Spanish (Castilian), spoken by about 99% of Spaniards as a first or second language. According to a 2019 Pew Research survey, the most commonly spoken languages at home other than Spanish were Catalan in 8% of households, Valencian 4%, Galician 3% and Basque in 1% of homes.

Distribution of the regional co-official languages in Spain:
Aranese, a variety of Occitan co-official in Catalonia. It is spoken in the Pyrenean comarca of the Aran Valley (Val d'Aran), in north-western Catalonia. It is a variety of Gascon, a southwestern dialect of the Occitan language.
Basque, co-official in the Basque Country and northern Navarre (see Basque-speaking zone). Basque is the only non-Romance language (as well as non-Indo-European) with an official status in mainland Spain.
Catalan, co-official in Catalonia and in the Balearic Islands. It is recognised but not official in Aragon, in the area of La Franja. Outside of Spain, it is the official language of Andorra; it is also spoken in the Pyrénées-Orientales department in southernmost France, and in the city of Alghero on the island of Sardinia, where it's co-official with Italian.
Valencian (variety of Catalan), co-official in the Valencian Community. Not all areas of the Valencian Community, however, are historically Valencian-speaking, particularly the western side. It is also spoken without official recognition in the area of Carche, Murcia.
Galician, co-official in Galicia and recognised, but not official, in the adjacent western parts of the Principality of Asturias (as Galician-Asturian) and Castile and León.

Spanish is official throughout the country; the rest of these languages have legal and co-official status in their respective communities and (except Aranese) are widespread enough to have daily newspapers and significant book publishing and media presence. Catalan and Galician are the main languages used by the respective regional governments and local administrations. A number of citizens in these areas consider their regional language as their primary language and Spanish as secondary.

In addition to these, there are a number of seriously endangered and recognised minority languages:
Aragonese, recognised, but not official, in Aragon.
Asturian, recognised, but not official, in Asturias. Part of the Asturleonese language along Leonese and others.
Leonese, recognised, but not official, in Castile and León. Spoken in the provinces of León and Zamora. Part of the Asturleonese language along Asturian and others.

Spanish itself also has distinct dialects. For example, the Andalusian or Canarian dialects, each with their own subvarieties, some of them being partially closer to the Spanish of the Americas, which they heavily influenced to varying degrees, depending on the region or period and according to different and non-homogeneous migrating or colonisation processes. Despite being a dialect, some Andalusian speakers have attempted to promote Andalusian as a different language independent of Spanish.

Five very localised dialects are of difficult filiation: Fala (a variety mostly ascribed to the Galician-Portuguese group locally spoken in an area of the province of Cáceres sometimes called Valley of Jálama/Xálima, which includes the towns of San Martín de Trevejo, Eljas and Valverde del Fresno); Cantabrian and Extremaduran, two Astur-Leonese dialects also regarded as Spanish dialects; Eonavian, a dialect between Asturian and Galician, closer to the latter according to several linguists; and Benasquese, a Ribagorçan dialect that was formerly classified as Catalan, later as Aragonese, and which is now often regarded as a transitional language of its own. Asturian and Leonese are closely related to the local Mirandese which is spoken on an adjacent territory but over the border into Portugal. Mirandese is recognised and has some local official status.

Portuguese has been traditionally spoken by the inhabitants of the following border areas: Cedillo and Herrera de Alcántara (province of Cáceres), La Alamedilla (province of Salamanca, primarily spoken in the place up until the mid-20th century), and Olivenza (province of Badajoz).

With the exception of Basque, which appears to be a language isolate, all of the languages present in mainland Spain are Indo-European languages, specifically Romance languages. Afro-Asiatic languages, such as Arabic (including Ceuta Darija) or Berber (mainly Riffian), are spoken by the Muslim population of Ceuta and Melilla and by recent immigrants (mainly from Morocco) elsewhere.

Past languages
In addition to the languages which continue to be spoken in Spain to the present day, other languages which have been spoken within what are now the borders of Spain include:

Tartessian language
Iberian language
Celtic languages
Celtiberian language
Gallaecian language
Lusitanian language
Punic language
Latin language
Guanche language
Galician-Portuguese
Gothic language
Vandalic language
Frankish language
Arabic
Andalusi Arabic
Classical Arabic
Judeo-Arabic
Mozarabic languages
Romani language

Languages that are now chiefly spoken outside Spain but which have roots in Spain are:

Judeo-Catalan, though the existence of this language has been questioned.
Judaeo-Spanish (Ladino)

Variants
There are also variants of these languages proper to Spain, either dialect, cants or pidgins:
Barallete
Bron
Caló
Cheli
Erromintxela
Fala dos arxinas
Gacería
Germanía
Xíriga

Further information
Aragonese (aragonés)
Astur-Leonese
Asturian (asturianu, bable)
Leonese (llionés)
Mirandese (mirandés, lhéngua mirandesa)
Extremaduran (estremeñu)
Cantabrian (cántabru, montañés)
Basque (euskara)
Catalan (català), known as Valencian (valencià) in the Valencian Community
Galician (galego)
Eonavian (eonaviego)
Fala (xalimego)
Gascon (Occitan dialect)
Aranese (aranés)
Spanish (español) 
Judaeo-Spanish (djudeo-espanyol, judezmo, ladino, sefardi, etc.)
Dialects of Spanish in Spain
 Andalusian Spanish (see also Andalusian language movement)
 Canarian Spanish
 Extremaduran Spanish (castúo)
 Murcian Spanish
Sign languages
Spanish Sign Language (lengua de signos española, LSE).
Catalan Sign Language (llengua de signes catalana, LSC) and Valencian Sign Language (llengua de signes valenciana, LSV).
Language politics in Francoist Spain

See also

Iberian languages
Languages of Portugal
Iberian Romance languages
Language politics in Spain under Franco
Hispanic

References

External links
Detailed Ethno-Linguistic map of Pre-Roman Iberia (around 200 BC)
Detailed linguistic map of Spain
 Languages in Spain - Find out information about the Official languages of Spain.

 
Paleohispanic languages
Extinct languages of Europe